Zaheer is an Urdu male given name and surname, a variant of Arabic Zahir. 

Notable people with the name include:

Given name 
Zaheer Abbas (1947–), Pakistani cricketer
Ajmal Zaheer Ahmad, American film director, writer and producer
Zaheer Ahmad (1948–), Pakistani American medical doctor, chief executive of the Shifa International Hospital, Islamabad
Zaheer Ali (1981–), Trinidadian cricketer
Zaheer-ul-Islam (1956–), former Director-General of Pakistan's Inter-Services Intelligence (ISI)
Anwar Zaheer Jamali (1951–), Pakistani jurist, 24th Chief Justice of Pakistan
Zaheer Khan (1978–), Indian cricketer
Zaheer Khan (Pakistani cricketer) (born 1979), Pakistani cricketer
Zaheer Maqsood (1985–), Emirati cricketer
Zaheer Mohamed (1985–), Guyanese cricketer
Syed Zaheer Rizvi (1968–), Pakistani music director and teacher
Zaheer Sher (born 1975), English cricketer

Surname 
Ehsan Elahi Zaheer (1945–1987), Pakistani Islamic theologian, leader of the Ahl-i Hadith movement
S. M. Zaheer (1947–), Indian actor
Sajjad Zaheer (1905–1973), Urdu writer, Marxist ideologue and radical revolutionary in both India and Pakistan
Syed Ali Zaheer, Indian politician and a minister in the first cabinet formed by Prime Minister Jawaharlal Nehru
Syed Husain Zaheer, Indian chemist, politician, director general of the Council of Scientific and Industrial Research (CSIR)
Syed Iqbal Zaheer (born 1944), Indian Islamic scholar and writer
Zafar Zaheer (born 1974), Bahraini cricketer

See also
Zaheer (The Legend of Korra), major recurring character in Nickelodeon's animated television series The Legend of Korra
Dr. S. Hussain Zaheer Memorial High School
Zaheera
Zahir (disambiguation)